3-Oxoacyl-CoA is a group of coenzymes involved in the metabolism of fatty acids.

References

Bibliography 

Metabolism
Thioesters of coenzyme A